Rachael Ann MacFarlane Laudiero (born March 21, 1976) is an American voice actress and singer. Her voice credits include Hayley Smith on the animated television show American Dad!, Supreme Leader Numbuh 362 in the television series Codename: Kids Next Door, and Kate Lockwell in the video game Starcraft II. She is the younger sister of Seth MacFarlane.

In addition to voice acting, MacFarlane has also been involved in other aspects of animation, such as being a production manager for The Grim Adventures of Billy & Mandy and Welcome to Eltingville and she wrote an episode of The Grim Adventures of Billy & Mandy, titled "Educating Grim".

Early life
MacFarlane was born in Kent, Connecticut. Her parents, Ronald Milton MacFarlane (born 1946) and Ann Perry Sager (1947–2010), were born in Newburyport, Massachusetts. Her brother is filmmaker, animator, and actor Seth MacFarlane (born 1973). MacFarlane's parents met in 1970, when they both lived and worked in Boston, Massachusetts, and married later that year. The couple moved to Kent in 1972, where Ann began working in the Admissions Office at South Kent School. She later worked in the College Guidance and Admissions Offices at the Kent School, a selective college preparatory school where Ronald also was a teacher.

MacFarlane went to Boston Conservatory but did not graduate before moving to Los Angeles to begin a career in voice acting.

Career
MacFarlane first started voicing characters on Hanna-Barbera shows including Johnny Bravo. Then after her work with Hanna-Barbera ended, MacFarlane began voicing many characters on Cartoon Network.

In addition to voice acting, Rachael has also been involved in other aspects of animation, such as being a production manager for The Grim Adventures of Billy & Mandy and Welcome to Eltingville, and wrote an episode of The Grim Adventures of Billy & Mandy, titled "Educating Grim" –  where she also met her husband. Seth MacFarlane asked her to help him with his new pilot for the Fox Broadcasting Company, which would become Family Guy. Rachael MacFarlane worked on the show providing incidental voices, and her brother told her she was good at it and asked her to stay, prompting her to move from New York City to Los Angeles. This launched her career as a voice actress; she remained an incidental cast member on Family Guy for several years and began getting other voice-over work on her own, working for both The Walt Disney Company and Cartoon Network. In 2005, her brother Seth cast her in his second major prime time animated show, American Dad!, where she voices Hayley Smith, protagonist Stan Smith’s rebellious teenage daughter.

MacFarlane also continues to contribute to Family Guy, on a regular basis. In September 2012, she released her first album Hayley Sings, which is a jazz vocal tribute to Hayley Smith, her character on American Dad!.

MacFarlane and her husband, Spencer Laudiero, have also published picture books for children.

Personal life
MacFarlane is married to animator Spencer Laudiero. They have two daughters.

On July 16, 2010, MacFarlane's mother, Ann Perry Sager, died of cancer. Her death was reported by Larry King on his show Larry King Live, who acknowledged a conversation he had with her during an interview with her son in May 2010.

MacFarlane has noted her similarities to Hayley Smith on American Dad!, revealing "We both share the same political views".

Rachael's brother, Seth is an atheist but she identifies as a Christian.

Filmography

Film

Animation

Video games

Discography

Studio albums

Bibliography

 Eleanor Wyatt, Princess and Pirate (Imprint, 2018, illustrated by Spencer Laudiero)
 Harrison Dwight, Ballerina and Knight (Imprint, 2019; illustrated by Spencer Laudiero)

References

External links

 

1976 births
20th-century American actresses
21st-century American actresses
Actresses from Connecticut
American women jazz singers
American jazz singers
American television writers
American video game actresses
American voice actresses
Boston Conservatory at Berklee alumni
Concord Records artists
Living people
Singers from Connecticut
People from Kent, Connecticut
21st-century American singers
21st-century American women singers
Jazz musicians from Connecticut